Above It All marks the thirteenth album from Phillips, Craig and Dean. Fair Trade Services released the project on November 10, 2014. Phillips, Craig and Dean worked with producers Seth Mosley and Nathan Nockels in the creation of this album.

Critical reception

Signaling in a four star review by CCM Magazine, Andy Argyrakis responds, "This thirteenth studio album once again features the trio’s signature harmonies over vertical lyrics, alongside some new-found electronic elements, which may seem out of character to more traditionally minded adult contemporary listeners, but never diminish these veteran singers’ seasoned abilities." Adding a half star to her rating compared to the aforementioned, New Release Tuesday's Phronsie Howell recognizes, "Above It All is an excellent worship album, and I can see a few of the songs being brought into the music rotation of many churches." Indicating in a three star review at Worship Leader, Barry Westman says, "a bit predictable".

Joshua Andre, awarding the album four stars at 365 Days of Inspiring Media, writes, "Phillips, Craig And Dean have created a stellar and engaging album, as Above It All combines the energetic and enthusiastic heart for Jesus that each of the three vocalists have, a fresh and relevant musical sound, as well as the musical prowess of producer Seth Mosley." Rating the album a 4.3 out of five for Christian Music Review, Laura Chambers says, "it doesn’t hurt that the melodies are appealing, and in, at least one case, groovy." Michael Dalton, indicating in a 3.5 out of five review at The Phantom Tollbooth, replies, "This consistently sounds a triumphant note."

Track listing

Personnel 
Phillips, Craig and Dean
 Randy Phillips – lead vocals (2-6, 10), backing vocals
 Shawn Craig – lead vocals (2, 3, 7), backing vocals
 Dan Dean – lead vocals (1-5, 8, 9), backing vocals

Tracks #1, 2 & 4–10
 Produced by Seth Mosley
 Engineered by Mike "X" O'Connor, Buckley Miller and Seth Mosley.
 Editing and Vocal Engineering –Mike "X" O'Connor and Jericho Scoggins
 Mixed by Sean Moffitt
 Recorded at Full Circle Music (Franklin,  TN).
 Mastered by Aya Merrill at Sterling Sound (New York, NY).
 Production Coordination – Celi Mosley
 Keyboards, synthesizers and Hammond B3 organ – Tim Lauer and Seth Mosley 
 Programming – Matt Stanfield and Seth Mosley 
 Guitars – Mike Payne, Andrew DeRoberts and Seth Mosley 
 Bass – Tony Lucido and Eli Beard
 Drums – Ben Phillips and Nick Buda
 Percussion – Seth Mosley and Ben Phillips
 Backing vocals – Seth Mosley, Tasha Leyton, Tyler George, Jordan George and Laura Cooksey

Track #3
 Produced and Recorded by Nathan Nockles
 Recorded at Berwick Lane (Atlanta, GA).
 Drums recorded by Stephen Lewieke
 Mixed by Neal Avron
 Mastered by Tom Coyne at Sterling Sound (New York, NY).
 Keyboards, programming and guitars – Nathan Nockles
 Additional programming – Joe Thibideau
 Bass – Chris Brink
 Drums – Paul Mabury

Production and design
 A&R – James Rueger
 Art Direction/Wardrobe – Dana Salsedo
 Design – Josh Hailey for Mellowtown
 Photography – Trey Hill
 Hair/Make-up – Heather Spivey

Charts

References

2014 albums
Phillips, Craig and Dean albums
Contemporary Christian music albums by American artists
Fair Trade Services albums